Selbekk is a Norwegian surname. Notable people with the surname include:

Christoffer Selbekk (1939–2012), Norwegian businessman and ski jumper
Vebjørn Selbekk (born 1969), Norwegian newspaper editor and author

Norwegian-language surnames